The B69 is a bus route that constitutes a public transit line operating in Brooklyn, New York City, running along 7th Avenue and Vanderbilt Avenue between Kensington and Dumbo. The B69 is operated by the MTA New York City Transit Authority. Its precursor was a streetcar line that began operation in 1869, and was known as the Vanderbilt Avenue Line. The route became a bus line in 1950.

Route description
The B69 bus route starts at McDonald Avenue and Cortelyou Road in Kensington. This terminus is shared with the B67. Then the two routes proceed up McDonald Avenue to 20th Street. Here, buses use 19th Street going north and 20th Street going south until 7th Avenue, where the two routes turn along 7th Avenue. From there, the lines run along that corridor, serving businesses and connecting to multiple bus and subway lines until Flatbush Avenue, where the B67 heads north on Flatbush Avenue. The B69, meanwhile, heads south on Flatbush, and goes around Grand Army Plaza to head back north on Vanderbilt Avenue. Once there, buses run up the length of the street until it meets Flushing Avenue, and it runs west on Flushing Avenue. This segment is shared with the B57. At Navy Street, the B69 turns onto Sands Street and runs along the street until its terminus at Pearl Street, just south of the York Street station.

History
The line along Vanderbilt Avenue from Myrtle Avenue south to Prospect Park was built in 1869 by the Brooklyn, Hunter's Point and Prospect Park Railroad as a branch of the Crosstown Line, connecting Williamsburg to the park. The branch was not profitable, and was bought (south of Park Avenue) by the Park Avenue Railroad, which then turned it into a line to the Fulton Ferry, which opened on May 3, 1871. The tracks of the Brooklyn City and Newtown Railroad (DeKalb Avenue Line) were used from the ferry south to Concord Street, heading eastbound on Water Street and Bridge Street and westbound on Front Street and Gold Street. From there, the line turned east along Concord Street to Navy Street, then traveled on the Crosstown Line tracks south along Navy Street for a block then heading east on Park Avenue. The line would then continue on its own trackage along Vanderbilt Avenue to Grand Army Plaza. Later on, the line was extended south on Prospect Park West to Greenwood Cemetery with the tracks between 9th Street and 15th Street belonging to the Coney Island and Brooklyn Railroad. Andrew R. Culver, {whom the IND Culver Line south to Coney Island is named for}, was president of the company by 1872.

The Park Avenue Railroad merged with the Greenwood and Coney Island Railroad on October 9, 1874 to form the Prospect Park and Coney Island Railroad (PP&CI). In June 1883, soon after the Brooklyn Bridge opened, the PP&CI rerouted the line as an effort to make more profit. Tracks were built on Concord Street from Bridge Street west to Washington Street, and the PP&CI used the newer alignment of the DeKalb Avenue Line on Washington Street past the bridge to Front Street and Water Street and the older alignment via Gold Street and Bridge Street, which had been used primarily by the PP&CI, was abandoned.

Following an agreement made on December 10, 1885, the Atlantic Avenue Railroad leased the Vanderbilt Avenue Line on January 1, 1886. This lease included the entire horsecar property of the PP&CI, which kept its steam railroad from the Ninth Avenue Depot adjacent to the Greenwood Cemetery south to Coney Island. It also included franchises to build and operate the old route via Gold Street and Bridge Street, as well as the proposed 15th Street Line from Hamilton Ferry to the depot, the Hicks Street Line from South Ferry to the depot, and the Park Avenue Line from Downtown Brooklyn east to Bushwick. Additionally, the Atlantic Avenue Railroad obtained a lease on the Ninth Avenue Depot. Culver had long desired to rid himself of the horse line, preferring to operate only the steam extension.

The Nassau Electric Railroad began operating the line under lease (of the Atlantic Avenue Railroad) on April 5, 1896, and the Brooklyn Heights Railroad leased the Nassau Electric in 1899. Vanderbilt Avenue cars were through-routed with the Gravesend Avenue Line until August 20, 1950 when buses were substituted for streetcars and the line was cut back to 19th Street.

Prior to 2010, the line ran along Eighth Avenue and Prospect Park West in Park Slope and terminated at 19th Street. This constitutes the southern portion of the line. In 2010, in response to a budget crisis, the B69 was rerouted to run along Seventh Avenue via the B67 route. At this time, service was also extended to Kensington, with service reduced on both routes so the frequency on Seventh Avenue to the Seventh Avenue (BMT Brighton Line) station would be the same as prior to the cutbacks (when the B67 was the only route on Seventh Avenue). At this time, weekend service was discontinued. In 2013, weekend service was restored.

On December 1, 2022, the MTA released a draft redesign of the Brooklyn bus network. As part of the redesign, B69 service south of Prospect Park West would be discontinued, though the B67 would continue to serve that segment. B69 service north of Flushing Avenue would take over B48's route to Greenpoint, while the B48 would take over the B69's route north of Flushing Avenue. Closely spaced stops would also be eliminated.

References

Streetcar lines in Brooklyn
B069
B069